Barcelona Sporting Club's 2012 season was the club's 87th year of existence, the 59th year in professional football, and the 54th in the top level of professional football in Ecuador.

Competitions

Pre-season friendlies

Serie A

First stage

Second stage

Other friendlies

External links
Official website 
Unofficial website 

Barcelona S.C. seasons
Barcelona